Pushpasharam is a 1976 Indian Malayalam film, directed by J. Sasikumar and produced by Anvar. The film stars Prem Nazir, Jayabharathi, Srividya and Adoor Bhasi in the lead roles. The film has musical score by M. S. Baburaj.

Cast
 
Prem Nazir 
Jayabharathi 
Srividya 
Adoor Bhasi 
Manavalan Joseph 
Prema 
Sreelatha Namboothiri 
T. S. Muthaiah 
Bahadoor 
Kuthiravattam Pappu 
M. G. Soman 
Meena 
S. P. Pillai 
Sadhana 
Sundicate Krishnan Nair
Kollam G. K. Pillai

Soundtrack
The music was composed by M. S. Baburaj and the lyrics were written by Anwar Suber.

References

External links
 

1976 films
1970s Malayalam-language films